A royal family order is a decoration conferred by the head of a royal family to their female relations. Such an order is considered more of a personal memento than a state decoration, although it may be worn during official state occasions.

The tradition is practiced in the royal families of the United Kingdom, Norway, Sweden, Denmark, Thailand and Tonga.

Insignia
The badge of a royal family order consists of a portrait of the sovereign set in diamonds, which is suspended from a ribbon. In the United Kingdom, the colour of the ribbon changes with each reign, the only kingdom that has this trait. On the back of the portrait frame is an engraving with the sovereign's monogram. A hidden pin attaches it to the wearer's clothes.

Sweden

Kungens miniatyrporträtt (literally the "King's miniature portrait") is a royal decoration unofficially given to female members of the Swedish royal family. It is similar to the family orders of other European monarchies, although the Swedish royal court refers to it as "The King's portrait".

History
The earliest known Swedish Decoration is that of King Oscar II. At that time, Decorations did not have to be attached to the Seraphim blue ribbon that is the case today. As there are no earlier records of royal family decorations in Sweden, it might be assumed that the decorations were not introduced in Sweden until the reign of Oscar II. Queen Sophia started "Sophiahemmet", a Red Cross nurse training program. At the graduation of the nurses, she presented a miniature portrait of the king on a white ribbon with a red cross. On the back was DSF inscribed in gold enamel on blue background. In the 1900s Gustav V and his wife Victoria made a special form of the order with both of them in the portrait as a gift to their friend Countess Anna Brahe (born Anna Nordenfalk) when she visited them. Currently recipients of the order wear it as part of their formal dress, often when their male counterparts wear medals.

Appearance
The decoration currently consists of an oval portrait of King Carl XVI Gustaf half length. There are different versions of the portrait of the King, where he is dressed in admiral's uniform or simply formal wear with either the Seraphim band or chain. The portrait is framed by brilliant-cut diamonds and a brilliant bow at the portrait above page. The portrait is attached to a bow in Seraphim light blue ribbon and is held to the person's attire with a pin that is not seen. Different designs of the frame exist: some are more decorated than others.

Recipients

From King Oscar II

From King Gustaf V
 Queen Victoria, Queen Consort - (wife)
 Queen Sophia, Queen Mother - (mother)
 Queen Ingrid, Queen Consort of Denmark - (granddaughter)
 Crown Princess Margaret - (daughter-in-law)
 Grand Duchess Maria Pavlovna - (daughter-in-law)
 Queen Louise - (daughter-in-law)
 Princess Sibylla, Duchess of Vasterbotten - (granddaughter-in-Law)

From King Gustaf VI Adolf

 Queen Louise, Queen Consort (wife)
 Queen Ingrid, Queen Mother of Denmark - (daughter)
 Princess Margaretha, Mrs. Ambler - (granddaughter)
 Princess Birgitta - (granddaughter)
 Princess Désirée, Baroness Silfverschiöld - (granddaughter)
 Princess Christina, Mrs. Magnuson - (granddaughter)
 Princess Sibylla, Duchess of Vasterbotten - (daughter-in-law)

From King Carl XVI Gustaf
 Princess Margaretha, Mrs. Ambler (1st eldest sister)
 Princess Birgitta (2nd eldest sister)
 Princess Désirée, Baroness Silfverschiöld (3rd eldest sister)
 Princess Christina, Mrs. Magnuson (4th elder sister)
 Queen Ingrid, Queen Dowager of Denmark (Aunt)
 Queen Silvia, Queen Consort (wife)
 Crown Princess Victoria (1st daughter)
 Princess Madeleine, Duchess of Halsingland and Gastrikland (2nd daughter)
 Princess Lilian, Duchess of Halland (Aunt by marriage)
 Princess Sofia, Duchess of Värmland (daughter-in-law)
 Countess Alice Trolle-Wachtmeister (Royal Court member)

Denmark

After the banishment of the adulterous Queen Caroline Mathilde on 17 January 1772 the Royal Danish Court needed a new decoration to replace the Order of Matilde. King Christian VII of Denmark founded this order on 21 October 1774 as a new decoration that was solely meant for the Danish Royal Family. It was awarded to gentlemen and ladies. The men wore the insignia detached from a ribbon on the left side of the breast. The ladies wore the same insignia on a bow of the same ribbon on their left shoulder.

After the death of Queen-Dowager Juliana Maria in 1796 the order fell into disuse.
In 1912 when King Christian X ascended to the throne this order was restored keeping to the present time.

 Order of Christian VII (1774–1796)
 Order of Christian X (1912–1947)
 Order of Frederik IX (1947–1972)
 Order of Margrethe II (1972)

Norway
Royal Family Order of Haakon VII of Norway (1906–1957)
Royal Family Order of Olav V of Norway (1957–1991)
Royal Family Order of Harald V of Norway (1991–current)

United Kingdom

The first Royal Family Order was issued during and after the regency of King George IV of the United Kingdom. Prior to 1820, he started the practice of presenting the badge of the order to ladies and gentlemen of the Court, particularly female members of the Royal family. An ornate frame of diamond oak leaves and acorns surrounded his portrait, suspended from a white silk bow which varied for men and women. As a girl, Princess Alexandrina of Kent (later Queen Victoria) received this badge from her uncle.

Royal family orders
 Royal Family Order of George IV (1821)
 Royal Order of Victoria and Albert (1862)
 Royal Family Order of Edward VII (1901)
 Royal Family Order of George V (1911)
 Royal Family Order of George VI (1937)
 Royal Family Order of Elizabeth II (1952)
 Royal Family Order of Charles III (2023)

References

External links
Images of all British orders at medals.org.uk